Elijah Galbraith-Knapp (born October 12, 1991) is an American professional soccer player who plays as a defender. Gailbraith-Knapp is currently a volunteer assistant coach for the Purdue Fort Wayne Mastodons men's soccer team and the youth technical director for Fort Wayne United SC.

Career

Early career
Galbraith-Knapp played college soccer at the University of San Diego between 2010 and 2013.

Galbraith-Knapp also appeared for USL PDL club FC Tucson between 2012 and 2014.

Professional
Galbraith-Knapp signed with United Soccer League club Tulsa Roughnecks in February 2015.

Galbraith-Knapp joined the Purdue Fort Wayne Mastodons staff as a volunteer assistant in July 2022.

References

External links 
 Tulsa Roughnecks profile

1991 births
Living people
American soccer players
San Diego Toreros men's soccer players
FC Tucson players
FC Tulsa players
Association football midfielders
Soccer players from San Diego
USL League Two players
USL Championship players
San Diego Sockers players
Major Arena Soccer League players
American expatriate sportspeople in Mexico
Expatriate footballers in Mexico
American expatriate soccer players
Purdue Fort Wayne Mastodons coaches
College men's soccer coaches in the United States